William Henry Magan (1820 – ) was an Irish Whig, Independent Irish Party and Repeal Association politician.

Magan was elected a Repeal Association Member of Parliament (MP) for Westmeath at the 1847 general election and, becoming an Independent Irish Party MP in 1852 and then a Whig again in 1857, held the seat until 1859 when he did not seek re-election.

References

External links
 

UK MPs 1847–1852
UK MPs 1852–1857
UK MPs 1857–1859
Irish Repeal Association MPs
Whig (British political party) MPs for Irish constituencies
Irish Nationalist politicians
1820 births
1861 deaths
Members of the Parliament of the United Kingdom for County Westmeath constituencies (1801–1922)